Presidente Roque Sáenz Peña Department is a  department of Córdoba Province in Argentina.

The provincial subdivision has a population of about 34,647 inhabitants in an area of 8,228 km², and its capital city is Laboulaye, which is located around 520 km from Capital Federal.

Settlements
General Levalle
La Cesira
Laboulaye
Leguizamón
Melo
Río Bamba
Rosales
San Joaquín
Serrano
Villa Rossi

Departments of Córdoba Province, Argentina